Anton Podobnik  was a politician of the late 18th century in Slovenia, when the country was under the Holy Roman Empire. He became mayor of Ljubljana in 1796. He was succeeded by Josip Kokail in 1797.

References

Mayors of places in the Holy Roman Empire
Mayors of Ljubljana
Year of birth missing
Year of death missing
18th-century Carniolan people